Vidya Shankar Aiyar is an anti-nuclear weapons activist, an independent analyst of international relations and a media professional, formerly Executive Editor of CNN IBN.

Career 
He was Honorary Adviser to the Indian PM’s nuclear disarmament group, 2011-14. He is the India Coordinator of the Parliamentarians for Nuclear Nonproliferation and Disarmament (PNND), and part of the Abolition 2000 network. He is associated with the International Campaign to Abolish Nuclear Weapons (ICAN). Dr. Aiyar successfully lobbied the Indian government to attend global anti-nuclear conferences in Oslo, Nayarit and Vienna. At the Vienna conference, Dr. Aiyar succeeded in making a presentation at the Austrian parliament, seeking its support to reverse Austria’s negative vote at the UN on India’s offer of a treaty prohibiting any use of nuclear weapons.

Aiyar obtained a doctorate on the breakup of the Soviet Union from Jawaharlal Nehru University in 1997. He led the first-ever South Asian team to the Harvard Project for Asian and International Relations. A Rockefeller Foundation 'Next Generation Strategic Analyst' (1988), he writes and speaks globally on these issues.

Dr. Aiyar was the executive editor and prime time anchor of CNN IBN, India. He hosted the Real India Travel Show on the BBC, and began Indian TV’s first popular chat show, the Eyewitness Chat Show, with Karan Thapar.

Aiyar worked an anchor for Channel NewsAsia, Singapore. He became the only Indian TV journalist to have interviewed both then Indian PM Vajpayee and Pakistan Chief Executive, Gen Pervez Musharaf. It was PM Vajpayee’s only TV interview given to an Indian.

Sexual assault conviction  
In the case of Public Prosecutor v Vidya Shankar Aiyar [2003] SGDC 327,  Aiyar was convicted by a court in Singapore for non-consensual sexual intercourse with an intoxicated woman. Aiyar was sentenced to 16 months in prison and four strokes of the cane, with the court describing him as a "hunting wolf in sheep's clothing". The  trial was  covered by leading news outlets in Singapore, Malaysia and India. Following an appeal to the President of Singapore, Aiyar managed to avoid the caning on medical grounds and his prison term was eventually reduced on grounds of good behaviour. Aiyar's counsel, the well-known criminal lawyer Subhas Anandan, later claimed that Aiyar's family members had "acted like royalty" and threatened that the case could jeopardise relations between Singapore and India.

Personal life 
Aiyar is the nephew of the Indian politician Mani Shankar Aiyar.

References 

Year of birth missing (living people)
Living people
Indian male journalists
CNN people
Jawaharlal Nehru University alumni